Buzz!: The Sports Quiz for the PlayStation 2, is the third game in the Buzz! series and was developed by Kuju Entertainment. Like the previous two games in the series (Buzz!: The Music Quiz, Buzz!: The BIG Quiz), it was released for the PlayStation 2 exclusively in Europe. Players answer questions  asked by the Quizmaster (Buzz) using their Buzz! buzzers.

Gameplay
The game, developed by Kuju Entertainment, is very similar to an actual game show, fit with the eponymous Quizmaster, his 'delicious' sidekick (Rose), buzzers, a theme song and an audience which claps and laughs. In every type of game, players must choose from easy mode or hard mode.

Players can choose from 16 characters to play as, each representing different sports. These include an auto racing driver, a darts player, a tennis player, a basketball player, a footballer/soccer player, an ice hockey goalie, a shotputter, a volleyball player, a sumo wrestler, a skier, a rugby player, a golfer, a horse rider, a cricketer, a boxer and an American football player. There are also three costumes to choose from for each. Players can choose from a short game, standard game, long game or a custom game.

Game modes
Any number of players from 1-8 can play at any one time.
Single player
A player can try to get as many points as possible in two different rounds.
Multiplayer
2-8 players play against each other for the most points.
Team player
3-8 players can team up to play against other teams for the most points. Each team chooses a captain.

Rounds

Multiplayer/team play
The Point Builder - A question comes up on the screen. Everyone answers in their own time. 
Fastest Finger - Everyone answers as quick as they can.
Spin - A board with four randomly selected sports plus a 'question mark' section is placed on a wheel. Players take turns trying to stop the arrow on their preferred sport. Everybody answers the question.
World of Sport - Starting in Great Britain, players answer questions to move around the world through various countries, finally ending up back in Britain. A right answer will move a player, while a quick answer might move a player two places along. The question will be about the country the leader is on.
Expert - Each player gets 60 seconds to fill in their bar by answering questions correctly. Each correct answer extends the bar, while each incorrect answer shrinks the bar. The player with the longest bar is the winner and receives bonus points.
Finish Line - Players are shown running on a treadmill with the finish tape ahead of them. To move closer, players must answer questions correctly.
Point Stealer - A question will appear and then one possible answer at a time will show up. Players must buzz as soon as they see what they think is the correct answer.
Risk - Players are shown what the next question will be about. They then choose how many points they want to bet on the question. If they answer correctly, they get what they wagered, otherwise those points are lost.
Estimation - A question will appear. A bar at the bottom will show the amounts. An arrow moves up and down the bar. Players must buzz when the arrow is on their desired answer.
Pass the Bomb - A bomb is randomly given to one of the players. They must answer the question that appears correctly to pass the bomb to the next player. The bomb ticks faster and faster until it explodes.

Single player
Time Builder - The player must answer questions to get time needed for the final round. The quicker they answer, the more seconds they get.
Hot Seat - The player has as much time as achieved in Time Builder to get points. A correct answer moves the player up the point ladder. The player can bank their points at any time in between a question. A wrong answer will take the player back to the start of the ladder.

References

External links 
 Buzz! official site
 Sleepydog Ltd
 Kuju Entertainment

2006 video games
PlayStation 2 games
PlayStation 2-only games
Europe-exclusive video games
Buzz!
Video games developed in the United Kingdom
Multiplayer and single-player video games